Yegor Alekseyevich Dorokhov (born 24 May 2000) is a Russian football player. He plays for FC Chelyabinsk on loan from FC Torpedo Moscow.

Club career
He made his debut in the Russian Professional Football League for FC Chelyabinsk on 10 April 2018 in a game against FC Neftekhimik Nizhnekamsk.

He made his Russian Football National League debut for FC Torpedo Moscow on 7 May 2022 in a game against FC Veles Moscow.

On 14 July 2022, Dorokhov was loaned to FC Veles Moscow.

Honours
Torpedo Moscow
 Russian Football National League : 2021-22

References

External links
 
 Profile by Russian Football National League 2
 Profile by Russian Football National League

2000 births
Living people
Russian footballers
Association football forwards
FC Torpedo Moscow players
FC Veles Moscow players
Russian Second League players
Russian First League players
People from Zlatoust
Sportspeople from Chelyabinsk Oblast